Lampropeltis ruthveni (common name: Ruthven's kingsnake) is a species of kingsnake in the family Colubridae. The species was described by Frank N. Blanchard in 1920 and named after American herpetologist Alexander Grant Ruthven. It is endemic to Mexico.

Description
Unlike many of the other Mexican kingsnakes,L. ruthveni has a fairly consistent coloration, consisting of white stripes on red, bordered by black. The red is always very vivid, and the black banding is relatively thick compared to that of the other Mexican kingsnakes. 
The body can be up to 127 cm long and has a ventral scale count of 182-195 ventral scales. The head is distinct from the neck, and the eyes are distinct from the head, with the eyes having a golden-brown coloration.

Distribution and Habitat
L. ruthveni is found in the Mexican states of Guanajuato, Hidalgo, Jalisco, Michoacán, and Querétaro. It occurs in  pine-oak forest and Mesquite grassland, in both semi-humid and arid environments. The species is also known to be plentiful in rocky areas adjacent to crop fields. Elevation ranges from 1,925m to 2,667m.

Diet
In the wild, L. ruthveni is known to predate on rodents, lizards, and other snakes.

Reproduction
L. ruthveni is oviparous, typically laying 6-10 eggs in a clutch.

Conservation
It is a common species but its abundance is decreasing. It is collected for the international pet trade (sometimes illegally), and also habitat loss (deforestation) is a threat. Its preference for steep rocky hillsides is believed to protect some populations from encroaching agriculture, but the range as a whole is extremely fragmented.

Captivity
L. ruthveni has a fairly stable captive population, with little collection from wild snakes. The albino morph is especially popular amongst captive breeders.

References

Further reading
Blanchard FN (1920). "Three New Snakes of the Genus Lampropeltis ". Occ. Pap. Mus. Zool., Univ. Michigan (81): 1–10. (Lampropeltis ruthveni, new species, pp. 8–10 + Plate I, figure 2).
Heimes P (2016). Snakes of Mexico: Herpetofauna Mexicana Vol. I. Frankfurt am Main, Germany: Chimaira. 572 pp. .
Hubbs B (2004). A Collective Natural History of California, Sonoran, Durango, and Queretaro Mountain Kingsnakes. Tempe, Arizona: Tricolor Books. 370 pp. .

ruthveni
Endemic reptiles of Mexico
Fauna of the Trans-Mexican Volcanic Belt
Reptiles described in 1920